Farzana Butt (born 27 May 1960) is a Pakistani politician who was a Member of the Provincial Assembly of the Punjab, from May 2013 to May 2018.

Early life and education
She was born on 27 May 1960.

She has completed Intermediate level education.

Political career
She was elected to the Provincial Assembly of the Punjab as a candidate of Pakistan Muslim League (N) on a reserved seat for women in 2013 Pakistani general election.

References

Living people
Punjab MPAs 2013–2018
1960 births
Pakistan Muslim League (N) politicians
Women members of the Provincial Assembly of the Punjab
21st-century Pakistani women politicians